Petar Stamatović (born 12 July 1995) is a former Serbian football midfielder.

Career
Born in Smederevo, Stamatović passed the youth school of Red Star Belgrade, but later returned to his home town and started his career in the club with the same name. He collected 22 Serbian First League matches and scored 2 goals. He also played 1 cup match. After the club was relegated to Serbian League West, Stamatović moved to Sinđelić Beograd, where he made 8 league and 1 appearance. At the beginning of 2015, he joined OFK Tabane Trgovački, where he spent the next six months. In summer 2015, he signed a one-year contract with Radnik Surdulica.

References

External links
 
 Petar Stamatović stats at utakmica.rs
 Petar Stamatović stats at footballdatabase.eu

1995 births
Living people
Sportspeople from Smederevo
Association football midfielders
Serbian footballers
FK Smederevo players
FK Sinđelić Beograd players
FK Radnik Surdulica players
Serbian SuperLiga players
Serbian First League players